Llaniestyn is a village and former civil parish in the Welsh county of Gwynedd.  The parish was abolished in 1934, and divided between Tudweiliog and Botwnnog.

References

Villages in Gwynedd
Tudweiliog